The Nizariyya are the largest modern branch of Isma'ilism.

The term can also refer to:
 Al-Nizariyah, village in central Syria
 term for the northern Arab tribes descended from Nizar ibn Ma'ad